Mark Carrington may refer to:

Mark Carrington (cricketer) (born 1961),  former New Zealand cricketer
Mark Carrington (footballer) (born 1987), English professional footballer